"Spirit" is a single by South African rapper Kwesta featuring American rapper Wale. The song was produced by Makwa 6eats and was certified Platinum by the Recording Industry of South Africa.

Composition

"Spirit" samples the 2011 South African number 1 hit record "These Tears"  as performed and written by South African House group Spiritchaser.

Music video
The music video was released on Kwesta's Vevo account on 11 January 2018. It was directed by Skeem Saams director Tebogo Malope in Katlehong, Ekurhuleni, Kwesta's birthplace. The video shows Kwesta and Wale performing to a crowd of fans, driving in a Lamborghini in a tunnel and popping alcoholic beverages.

IOL wrote:

The music video features a cameo by American rapper, singer-songwriter, and record producer, Jidenna and Ekurhuleni mayor Mzwandile Masina.

Charts

Accolades 
"Spirit" was nominated at 2018  DStv Mzansi Viewers' Choice Awards.

|-
|2018
|"Spirit"
| Favourite Song Of the Year 
|

Release history

References

External links 

2017 songs
2017 singles
Hip hop songs
Wale (rapper) songs
Kwesta songs
Songs written by Wale (rapper)